Bourem  is a commune and small town in the Gao Region of northeastern Mali. The town sits on the left bank of the River Niger.

References

External links
.

Communes of Gao Region
Communities on the Niger River